Lance Brenton Latham (1894–1985), was a prominent preacher, evangelist, youth minister, and musician in the early to mid-20th century in Chicago, Illinois.  He was known to many familiar with his ministry as "Doc," and his wife Virginia was known as "Teach."

Early life
Latham was a child prodigy, able to recite the entire Westminster Shorter Catechism by age 7.  He was the pianist for the Chicago Gospel Tabernacle under evangelist Paul Rader.  While there, Latham organized a children's ministry called the White Shirt Brigades.  Through this ministry Latham developed the principles that would eventually lead to the launching of Awana.

Career
Latham's ministry had a global impact.  He founded the Awana Youth Association which quickly expanded to tens of thousands of clubs on every continent.  Through Latham's leadership, hundreds of thousands of boys and girls in thousands of churches have engaged in Bible memory, activities, and evangelism.  Latham also founded Camp Awana, a pioneer in Christian camping.  Thousands of young people experienced conversions to Christ through Latham's teaching at Camp Awana, including notables such as Bill Hybels, founding pastor of Willow Creek Community Church.  Latham was the founding pastor of the North Side Gospel Center, a church in Chicago.  Latham's influence spread throughout the midwest and around the country.

One of the highlights of Latham's ministry was an annual Four Piano Concert.  Latham, a concert-caliber pianist, arranged music for the four Steinway Grand Pianos and led an evening of inspiration and music for tens of thousands.  Latham also composed numerous hymns and choruses, most notably:  Only Jesus, and Blessed Calvary. He also authored "The Two Gospels".

Death
Latham died in 1985.

See also 
Art Rorheim
HCJB
Trans World Radio
Slavic Gospel Association
Youth for Christ
Scripture Press
Pacific Garden Mission
Old Fashioned Revival Hour
The People's Church of Toronto
Barrington College

References

Notes
 Latham, Lance: The Two Gospels, AWANA Clubs International, One East Bode Road, Streamwood, Illinois 60107, 1984
 Lance Latham's official biography, Lance:  A Testament of Grace, was written by Dave Breese.

External links 
Cyber Hymnal biography
Photo:  Lance Latham and Merrill Dunlop
Photo:  Lance and Virginia Latham

1894 births
1985 deaths
20th-century American clergy